The former First Church of Christ, Scientist is an historic Christian Science church building located at 1200 North Robinson Avenue in Oklahoma City, Oklahoma, United States. Built in 1920, it was designed in the Classical Revival style of architecture. On September 9, 2001, was added to the National Register of Historic Places.

National register listing
First Church of Christ, Scientist (added 2001 - Building - #01000949)
Also known as Center for Design Arts
1200 N. Robinson Ave., Oklahoma City
Historic Significance: 	Architecture/Engineering
Architectural Style: 	Classical Revival
Area of Significance: 	Architecture
Period of Significance: 	1900-1924
Owner: 	Private
Historic Function: 	Religion
Historic Sub-function: 	Religious Structure
Current Function: 	Work In Progress

Current status
Oklahoma City businessman and tax attorney, Travis Watkins, purchased the former First Church of Christ, Scientist building at 1200 N. Robinson in August, 2018 as the headquarters of Travis W. Watkins Tax Resolution & Accounting Firm. First Church of Christ, Scientist now holds services at 4700 North Portland.

See also
National Register of Historic Places listings in Oklahoma County, Oklahoma
List of former Christian Science churches, societies and buildings
 First Church of Christ, Scientist (disambiguation)

References

External links
 National Register listings for Oklahoma County
 1200 N. Robinson description

Churches on the National Register of Historic Places in Oklahoma
Former Christian Science churches, societies and buildings in the United States
Churches in Oklahoma City
Former churches in Oklahoma
National Register of Historic Places in Oklahoma City